Oak Ridge in Santa Clara County, California, is a ridge forming the east canyon wall of Arroyo Hondo, which drains into Calaveras Reservoir. Black Mountain is its highest point. The first known white settlers on Oak Ridge were the Parks family, who ran cattle on the ridge. Now owned by the San Francisco Water Department, the ridge is private property and is off-limits to most people.

See also 
 Arroyo Hondo
 Milpitas, California

References 

Landforms of Santa Clara County, California
Milpitas, California
Ridges of California